Amal Maher (born 19 February 1985) is an Egyptian singer. She is heavily influenced by Umm Kulthum. She began singing as a child and was discovered by the general public at the age of fifteen by taking up the songs of Umm Kulthum. Deciding to forgo traditional schooling, Maher enrolled at the Conservatory of Arabic music to start a singing career. She soon met the composer Mohamed Diae, whom she eventually married and had a son with. Diae helped Amal Maher release a song and video clip for Ely Binak W Binah. The song was popular on radio and music television. Maher recorded her first song in 2006 and received the support of Ammar El Sherei, who she considers to be her spiritual father because he has been a loyal supporter and mentor throughout her career. In 2004, she released her first album, Isa 'Ini Ana with many singles such as Eini Aliki Ta Tiba, Makanak, Alo El Malayka, Ana El Basha Ghona, Ana Baadak and Ya Marsr.

Maher has held several concerts in Egypt and the neighboring countries. In 2009, she appeared in several festivals in the region. She recorded a second album which is still unreleased. Initially scheduled for 2010, the release date was postponed to the New Year, then to mid-January, and so on and so forth. She released an album called Araf Mnein in 2011, and it won an award for "Best Album by a Female Artist".

Personal life 

Maher has one son "Omar" from her first marriage to the composer Mohamed Diaa. She filed for divorce after one year of marriage  She was later reportedly married to Saudi Turki Al-Sheikh as of 2017.

In June 2021, she announced her retirement from the music industry, due to personal reasons.

Discography

Studio albums 
 2006: "Isalni Ana" (Ask Me)
 2011: "A'raf Mneen" (How Could I Know ?)
 2015: "Welad El Neharda"
 2019: "Asl El Ehsas" (The origin of sense) collaboration with A. R. Rahman

Singles 
 Eini Aliki Ya Tiba! (O Tiba!)
 Makanak
 Alo El Malayka (Angels)
 Ana Baasha El Ghona (I Adore Singing)
 Ana Baadak (After You)
 Ya Masr! (O Egypt!)
 Saken Allayl
 Ana bint 
Arabia ya arth falisteen
ya masryeen
Alheera
nabd alshuara
Ahterami lel harami
Zekryatna 2015 Amal Maher & Hany Shaker

References

External links 

1985 births
Living people
21st-century Egyptian women singers
Egyptian film actresses
Egyptian television actresses
Singers from Cairo